Thadée Cisowski (16 February 1927 – 24 February 2005), originally Tadeusz Cisowski, was a French former footballer who played as a striker. A son of Polish immigrants, he was regarded one of the best goalscorers in Championnat de France.

In the World Cup qualifying match against Belgium in 1956, he scored five goals, equaling the France record set by Eugène Maës in 1913.

Career statistics

Club

International

References

External links
 

1927 births
2005 deaths
People from Hrubieszów County
Sportspeople from Lublin Voivodeship
People from Lublin Voivodeship (1919–1939)
Association football forwards
French footballers
France international footballers
FC Metz players
Racing Club de France Football players
Valenciennes FC players
FC Nantes players
Ligue 1 players
Ligue 2 players
Polish emigrants to France